Henry Hales (died after 1389) was a member of the Parliament of England for the constituency of Maldon in Essex in the parliaments of 1373, January 1377 and February 1388. He was also bailiff of Maldon in 1386–87 and wardman in 1387–1399.

References 

Members of Parliament for Maldon
English MPs 1373
Cloth merchants
Year of birth unknown
Year of death unknown
14th-century English businesspeople
English MPs January 1377
English MPs February 1388